The river Bolbec or Commerce is one of the rivers that flow from the plateau of the southern Pays de Caux in the Seine-Maritime département of Normandy  into the Seine.

The river rises at Bolbec and passes Gruchet-le-Valasse, where its name changes to the Commerce. It then passes through Lillebonne and joins the Seine at Notre-Dame-de-Gravenchon.

Economy 

The river hosted many watermills that powered machinery to process both cotton and flax. The area became so prosperous it was named the Golden Valley.

See also 
French water management scheme

References

Rivers of France
Rivers of Normandy
Rivers of Seine-Maritime